George Irvine Hunter (29 August 1930 – 5 October 1990) was a Scottish footballer, who played as a goalkeeper for Neilston, Celtic, Derby County, Exeter City, Yiewsley, Darlington, Weymouth, Burton Albion, Lincoln City and Matlock Town. Hunter was part of the Celtic team that won the 1951 Scottish Cup Final.

References

Sources

External links
George Hunter at TheCelticWiki, an external wiki

1930 births
1990 deaths
People from Troon
Association football goalkeepers
Scottish footballers
Celtic F.C. players
Derby County F.C. players
Exeter City F.C. players
Darlington F.C. players
Weymouth F.C. players
Burton Albion F.C. players
Lincoln City F.C. players
Matlock Town F.C. players
Scottish Football League players
English Football League players
Place of birth missing
Footballers from South Ayrshire
Neilston Juniors F.C. players
Scottish Junior Football Association players